Panto is a surname. Notable people with the surname include:

Giorgio Panto (1941–2006), Italian entrepreneur and politician
Hariyanto Panto (born 1998), Indonesian footballer
Miguel Ángel Pantó (born 1912), Argentine footballer
Pete Panto (1911–1939), Italian-American longshoreman and union activist
Salvatore J. Panto, Jr. -- Mayor, Easton PA 1984-1992 and 2008-Present